Stemonosudis elongata  is a species of fish found in the Indo-Pacific from East Africa across to the Philippines, Fiji, the Hawaiian Islands., including the Marquesas.

Size

References

Paralepididae
Taxa named by Vilhelm Ege
Fish described in 1933